This is a list of Canadian poets. Years link to corresponding "[year] in poetry" articles.

A 

Mark Abley (born 1955), poet, journalist, editor, and non-fiction writer.
Milton Acorn (1923–1986), poet, writer, and playwright
José Acquelin (born 1956)
Gil Adamson, novelist, poet, and short-story writer
Randell Adjei
Marie-Célie Agnant (born 1953), Haitian native living in Canada since 1970; novelist, poet and writer of children's books
Neil Aitken (born 1974), poet, editor, and translator
Kateri Akiwenzie-Damm (born 1965), Anishinaabe writer and poet from the Chippewas of Nawash First Nation, founder (in 1993) of Kegedonce Press, specializing in indigenous writers
Donald Alarie (born 1945), writer, poet, and teacher
Edna Alford, editor, author, and poet who co-founded the magazine Dandelion
Sandra Alland (born 1973), Scottish-Canadian writer, multimedia artist, bookseller, small press publisher, and activist
Donna Allard, editor and poet
Lillian Allen (born 1951), dub poet
Anne-Marie Alonzo (1951–2005), playwright, poet, novelist, critic, and publisher, born in Egypt and moved to Canada at the age of 12
George Amabile (born 1936)
Madhur Anand (born 1971), poet and scientist
Marguerite Andersen (1924–2022), German-born, primarily francophone writer, academic and editor
Patrick Anderson (1915–1979), English-born Canadian poet and academic
Rod Anderson (1935), poet, musician, and accountant
Michael Andre (born 1946), poet, critic, and editor living in the United States
Jeannette Armstrong (born 1948), Syilx Okanagan author, educator, artist, and activist
Tammy Armstrong
David Arnason (born 1940), author and poet
Joanne Arnott (born 1960), Métis poet, essayist, and activist writer
Margaret Atwood (born 1939), poet, novelist, literary critic, feminist, and activist
Charlotte Aubin
Martine Audet (born 1961)
Oana Avasilichioaei, poet and translator
Margaret Avison (1918–2007)

B 

Ken Babstock (born 1970)
Elizabeth Bachinsky
Alfred Bailey (1905–1997), poet, anthropologist, ethno-historian, and academic administrator
Jacob Bailey (1731–1808), Church of England clergyman and poet born in the United States (colony of New Hampshire), immigrated to Nova Scotia, Canada in 1779
Marie Annharte Baker (born 1942) is an Anishnabe poet and author
Chris Banks (born 1970)
Kaushalya Bannerji, Indian-born poet
Frances Bannerman (1855–1944), painter and poet
Simina Banu
Joelle Barron
John Barton (born 1957)
Gary Barwin (born 1964), author, composer, children's writer, and poet
Jalal Barzanji (born 1953), Kurdish poet and writer living in Canada since 1998
Shaunt Basmajian (1950–1990), poet and author
Angèle Bassolé-Ouédraogo (born 1967)), Ivoirian born poet and journalist
Bill Bauer (1932–2010), American-born, living in Canada since 1965, husband of Nancy Bauer
Nancy Bauer (born 1934), American-born, living in Canada since 1965, wife of Bill Bauer
Doug Beardsley (born 1941), poet and academic
Nérée Beauchemin (1850–1931), francophone poet and physician
Derek Beaulieu (born 1973), poet, publisher, and anthologist.
Joseph-Isidore Bédard (1806–1833), poet, lawyer, and politician
Ven Begamudré (born 1956), Indian-born poet, short-story writer, novelist, and academic
Henry Beissel (born 1929), poet, author, writer, and editor
Billy-Ray Belcourt
Ken Belford (born 1946)
Lesley Belleau
Marlène Belley (born 1963),
John Bemrose, arts journalist, novelist, poet, and playwright
Gwen Benaway
Roxanna Bennett
Robbie Benoit (died 2007), poet and writer
Jovette Bernier (1900–1981), Quebec poet, novelist, and journalist
Jean-Philippe Bergeron (born 1978), francophone writer and poet
Craven Langstroth Betts (1853–1941), author and poet
Navtej Bharati, Indian-born poet and writer in Punjabi and English, publisher of Third Eye Press
Bertrand Bickersteth
Robert Billings (1949–1986), poet and editor
Earle Birney (1904–1995)
Bill Bissett (born 1939)
Cassandra Blanchard
Mark Blagrave (born 1956), writer, short-story writer, playwright, poet, and academic
Robin Blaser (1925–2009), author and poet
Laurie Block (born 1949), poet and educator
E. D. Blodgett (1935–2018), poet, literary critic, and translator
Ali Blythe, poet and editor
Robert Boates (born 1954)
Christian Bök, (born Christian Book 1966), poet and author
Dennis E. Bolen, (born 1953), novelist, journalist and poet
Stephanie Bolster (born 1969), poet and academic
Shane Book
Roo Borson pen name of Ruth Elizabeth Borson (born 1952), American native living in Canada
Hédi Bouraoui (born 1932), Tunisian-born Canadian poet, novelist, and academic
Arthur Bourinot (1893–1969), poet and lawyer
George Bowering (born 1935), novelist, poet, historian, and biographer
Marilyn Bowering (1949), poet, novelist, and playwright
Tim Bowling (born 1964), poet and novelist
Alex Boyd (born 1969), poet, fiction writer, critic, essayist, and editor
Frances Boyle
David Bradford
Kate Braid (born 1947), poet and teacher
Lawrence Ytzhak Braithwaite (1963–2008), novelist, spoken word artist, dub poet, essayist, digital drummer, and short-story writer
Shannon Bramer (born 1973), poet and teacher
Dionne Brand (born 1953), poet, novelist, and non-fiction writer born and raised in Trinidad and Tobago before moving to Canada
Di Brandt née "Diana Ruth Janzen" (born 1952), poet and literary critic
Jacques Brault (born 1933), French Canadian poet and translator
Diana Brebner (1956–2001)
Brian Brett (born 1950), poet and novelist
Elizabeth Brewster (1922–2012), poet and academic
Robert Bringhurst (born 1946), poet, typographer, and author
Eve Brodlique (1867–1949), poet, author, journalist
David Bromige (1933–2009), Canadian poet living in the United States since 1962
Nicole Brossard (born 1943), francophone poet and novelist
Audrey Alexandra Brown (1904–1998)
Ronnie R. Brown (born 1946), United States-born living in Canada for most of her adult life
Colin Browne
Charles Tory Bruce (1906–1971), poet, journalist and fiction writer
Julie Bruck
Robert Budde (born 1966), poet, novelist, and academic
Suzanne Buffam
April Bulmer (born 1963)
Murdoch Burnett (1953–2015), poet, performance artist, editor, and community activist
Mick Burrs (1940–2021)
Aaron Bushkowsky (born 1957)
Arthur de Bussières (1877–1913)

C 

Charmaine Cadeau
Alison Calder (born 1969), poet and academic
Frank Oliver Call (1878–1956)
Barry Callaghan (born 1937), author, poet, and son of the author Morley Callaghan
Jason Camlot (born 1967), poet, scholar, and songwriter
Anne Cameron (born 1938), novelist, poet, screenwriter, and short-story writer
George Frederick Cameron (1854–1885), poet, lawyer, and journalist
Wilfred Campbell (1858–1918), poet and Anglican clergyman
Natalee Caple (born 1970), novelist and poet
Paul Cargnello (born 1979), Montreal poet, lyricist
Bliss Carman (1861–1929), poet and critic
Anne Carson (born 1950), poet, essayist, translator, and academic
Kate Cayley, poet, writer, and theatre director
Weyman Chan (born 1963), poet
Catherine Chandler (born 1950), poet, translator, and academic
William Chapman (1850–1917), poet, journalist, and bureaucrat
Jean Charbonneau (1875–1960), francophone poet who was the primary founder of the Montreal Literary School
Herménégilde Chiasson (born 1946), Acadian poet, playwright, journalist, academic, and the Lieutenant-Governor of New Brunswick
Robert Choquette (1905–1991), novelist, poet, and briefly (1968–1970) a diplomat
Lesley Choyce (born 1951), novelist, writer, children's book writer, poet, and academic who founded Pottersfield Press and hosts the television program "Choyce Words" and "Off the Page"; born in the United States and immigrated to Canada in 1979
Margaret Christakos (born 1962), poet and university writing teacher
Evie Christie (born 1979), poet
Jillian Christmas, poet
Chuan Sha, Chinese-born Canadian poet and author 
Dave Clark, musician (Rheostatics) and poet
George Elliott Clarke (born 1960), poet and playwright.
Wayne Clifford (born 1944)
Fred Cogswell (1917–2004)
Leonard Cohen (1934–2016), singer-songwriter, musician, poet, and novelist
Matt Cohen, (1942–1999), writer and poet
Victor Coleman
Don Coles (1928–2017), poet, author, and academic
Stephen Collis, poet and academic
John Robert Colombo (born 1936), poet, anthologist, editor, essayist, and humorist
Daria Colonna
Anne Compton (born 1947), poet, critic, and anthologist
Wayde Compton (born 1972), poet, writer, turntable-based "sound poetry" performer, academic who co-founded Commodore Books, the first black-oriented press in Western Canada
Jan Conn (born 1952), Canadian-born geneticist and poet living in the United States
Karen Connelly (born 1969), writer and poet
Kevin Connolly (born 1962), poet, writer, and critic
Dennis Cooley (born 1944), poet and academic
Afua Cooper (born 1957), Jamaican-born historian and dub poet
Judith Copithorne (born 1939), concrete and visual poet
Paulo da Costa, Canadian-Portuguese author, editor, and translator
Sonia Cotten (born 1974), poet
Maya Cousineau Mollen
Dani Couture (born 1978), poet, essayist, critic, and journalist
Thomas Cowherd (1817–1907), tinsmith and poet
Isabella Valancy Crawford (1850–1887), poet, novelist, and short-story writer
Octave Crémazie (1827–1879), francophone poet who has been called "the father of French-Canadian poetry" for his patriotic verse
Lynn Crosbie (born 1963), poet and novelist
Lorna Crozier (born 1948), writes under the name Lorna Uher
Michael Crummey (born 1965), poet and writer
Julie Crysler, journalist and poet
Nancy Jo Cullen, poet and short story writer
Jen Currin, United States-born poet
Kayla Czaga (born 1989), poet

D 

Cyril Dabydeen (born 1945), native Guyana poet and writer living in Canada
Kalli Dakos (born 1950), children's poet and teacher
Michel Dallaire (1957–2017), novelist and poet
Mary Dalton, poet and academic
Joseph A. Dandurand, Native American poet, playwright, and archaeologist
Jean-Paul Daoust (born 1946), poet
Beverley Daurio (born 1953)
Frank Davey (born 1940), poet and academic
Lynn Davies (born 1954), poet
Nicholas Flood Davin (1840–1901), lawyer, journalist, politician, and poet
Tanya Davis, spoken-word poet and musician
Tom Dawe (born 1940), writer, poet, children's book author, and artist
Adriana de Barros (born 1976), Portuguese native who moved to Canada at age 3; illustrator, web designer, and poet
Sadiqa de Meijer (born 1966)
James Deahl (born 1945), moved to Canada from the United States in 1970 and a citizen of both countries; poet, academic, and publisher of Unfinished Monument Press; founding member of the Canadian Poetry Association
Kris Demeanor, poet, musician and actor
Shawna Dempsey and Lorri Millan, performance art duo who have collaborated on performances, films, videos, publications, and public art projects since 1989
Barry Dempster (born 1952), poet and novelist
Joe Denham, poet and fiction writer
Michelle Desbarats, poet
Anne-Marie Desmeules, poet
Christopher Dewdney (born 1951), poet, writer, artist, creative-writing teacher, and writer-in-residence at various universities
Ann Diamond (born 1951), an award-winning Montreal poet, novelist, and short-story writer
Pier Giorgio Di Cicco (1949–2019), Italian-born, Canadian poet and priest
Mary di Michele (born 1949), Italian-born, Canadian poet, author, and creative-writing teacher
Adam Dickinson, poet
Robert Dickson (1944–2007), poet, translator, and academic
Kildare Dobbs (1923–2013), Indian-born teacher, poet, editor, short-story writer, and travel writer who moved to Canada in 1950
Jeramy Dodds (born 1974), poet
Don Domanski (born 1950)
Magie Dominic (born 1944), poet and artist
Jeffery Donaldson, poet and critic
David Donnell (born 1939), poet and writer
Candas Dorsey (born 1952), poet and science fiction novelist
Clive Doucet (born 1946), writer, poet, and politician
Gordon Downie (1964–2017), songwriter, poet, and musician
Orville Lloyd Douglas (born 1976), poet and writer
Stan Dragland (born 1942), novelist, poet and literary critic
William Henry Drummond (1854–1907), Irish-born Canadian poet
Louis Dudek (1918–2001), poet, literary critic and publisher
Marilyn Dumont (born 1955), poet and educator
Klara du Plessis, poet

E 

Evelyn Eaton (1902–1983), novelist, short-story writer, poet, and academic
Vic Elias (1948–2006), American-born, living in Canada from 1979, poet and academic
David Elliott (1923–1999), poet and academic
Rebecca Elson (1960–1999), Canadian-American astronomer, academic writer, and poet
Crispin Elsted
Karen Enns
Reuben Epp (1920–2009) teacher, school administrator, writer and poet in Plautdietsch (Mennonite Low German)
Michael Estok (1939–1989)

F 

Margaret Fairley (1885–1968), English-born Canadian writer, educator and political activist
Brian Fawcett (1944–2022), poet, novelist, nonfiction author and writer
Charles Fenerty (c. 1821–1892), poet, journalist, and inventor. Published two poems in book format in 1855 and 1866, and wrote over 32 poems (mostly published in local newspapers).
Ferron, born Debby Foisy (1952), folk singer, songwriter and poet
George Fetherling, wrote as "Doug Feathering" or "Douglas Fetherling" until 1999 when he began using his middle name (born 1949), American-born poet, novelist, journalist and essayist who moved to Canada at age 18 and became a Canadian citizen
Connie Fife
Robert Finch (1900–1995), poet and academic whose area of expertise was French poetry
Joan Finnigan (1925–2007), writer, poet, teacher and newspaper reporter
Jon Paul Fiorentino, poet, novelist, short-story writer, academic and editor of Matrix magazine
Judith Fitzgerald (born 1952), poet and journalist
Polly Fleck
Robert Ford (1915–1998), poet, translator and diplomat
Raymond Fraser (born 1941), novelist, poet, biographer, essayist and editor
Louis-Honoré Fréchette (1839–1908), French Canadian poet, politician, playwright and short-story writer
Pauline Fréchette (1889–1943), French Canadian poet, dramatist, journalist, and Catholic nun
Patrick Friesen (born 1946), poet and university-level creative writing teacher
Mark Frutkin (born 1948), American-born novelist and poet who moved to Canada in 1970 as a Vietnam War draft resister

G 

Rhonda Ganz
François-Xavier Garneau (1809–1866), French Canadian notary, poet, civil servant, and historian
Hector de Saint-Denys Garneau (1912–1943), first modernist French Canadian poet
Bill Gaston (born 1953), novelist, playwright, short-story writer, and poet
Antoine Gérin-Lajoie (1824–1882), French Canadian poet and novelist
Marty Gervais (born 1946), poet, photographer, professor, journalist, and publisher of Black Moss Press
Chantal Gibson
Elsa Gidlow
Angus Morrison Gidney (1803–1882), educator, poet, and journalist
Gerry Gilbert
Charles Ignace Adélard Gill (1871–1918), painter and poet
John Glassco (1909–1981), poet, memoirist, and novelist
Jacques Godbout (born 1933), novelist, essayist, children's writer, journalist, filmmaker, and poet
Gérald Godin (1938–1994), French Canadian poet and politician
Oliver Goldsmith (1794–1861)
Leona Gom (born 1946), novelist and poet
Katherine L. Gordon
Phyllis Gotlieb (1926–2009), science fiction novelist and poet
Nora Gould
Susan Goyette (born 1964), poet and novelist
Neile Graham (born 1958), poet and academic
Alain Grandbois (1900–1975), French Canadian poet
Richard Greene
Leslie Greentree, poet, short-story writer, and freelance writer
Ralph Gustafson (1909–1995), poet and academic
Genni Gunn (born 1949), novelist, poet, and translator
Kristjana Gunnars, Icelandic-Canadian poet and novelist
Stephen Guppy

H 

Paul Haines (1933–2003), poet and jazz lyricist, born in the United States and later a Canadian resident
Helen Hajnoczky (born 1985), visual poet
Phil Hall (born 1953), poet, academic, and publisher of broadsides and chapbooks under the Flat Singles Press imprint since 1976
Jane Eaton Hamilton (born 1954), short-story writer, poet, and photographer
Jennica Harper
Claire Harris (1937–2018)
Michael Harris
Richard Harrison
Paul Hartal (born 1936), painter and poet, born in Hungary
Jill Hartman (born 1974 in poetry), poet and editor
Diana Hartog
Elisabeth Harvor (née Deichman) (born 1936), novelist and poet
Robert Hayman (1575–1629), poet, colonist and Proprietary Governor of Bristol's Hope colony in Newfoundland
Charles Heavysege (1816–1876)
Anne Hébert (1916–2000), French-Canadian novelist and poet
Wilfrid Heighington (1897–1945), soldier, writer, poet, lawyer, and politician
Steven Heighton (1961-2022), novelist and poet
David Helwig (1938–2018), poet, novelist, and essayist; father of Maggie Helwig
Maggie Helwig (born 1961), poet, novelist, peace and human rights activist; daughter of David Helwig
Anna Minerva Henderson (1887–1987), poet and civil servant
Brian Henderson (born 1948), poet, academic, and editor
Jason Heroux (born 1971), third poet laureate of Kingston, Ontario, born in Montreal
Benjamin Hertwig
Robert Hilles (born 1951), poet and novelist
Robert Hogg (1942)
Susan Holbrook
Clive Holden
Norah M. Holland (1876–1925), poet, playwright, journalist, editor
Nancy Holmes
Cornelia Hoogland (born 1952), poet and academic
Hilda Mary Hooke (1898–1978), poet and playwright 
Leah Horlick
Sean Horlor (born 1981) poet, former speechwriter, freelance writing consultant
Karen Houle
Liz Howard
Harry Howith (1934–2014)
Ray Hsu, poet and academic
David Huebert
Helen Humphreys (born 1961), poet and novelist
Al Hunter poet, author, tribal leader, and activist
Aislinn Hunter (born 1969), poet and author
Bruce Hunter (born 1952), teacher, poet, fiction writer, and lifewriter
Catherine Hunter (born 1957), poet, novelist, editor, academic, and critic
Chris Hutchinson (born 1972)
Douglas Smith Huyghue (1816–1891), Canadian and Australian poet, fiction writer, essayist, and artist
Maureen Hynes (born 1948), poet

I 

Susan Ioannou (born 1944)
Doyali Islam
Frances Itani (born 1942), novelist, short-story writer, poet, and essayist

J 

Suzanne Jacob (born 1943), novelist, poet, playwright, singer-songwriter, and critic
Jemeni (born 1976), actress, writer and activist
Paulette Jiles (born 1943), American-born poet and novelist who moved to Canada in 1969
Rita Joe (1932–2007), Mi'kmaq-Canadian poet and songwriter, called the "poet laureate of the Mi'kmaq people"
E. Pauline Johnson, also known as "Tekahionwake" (1861–1913)
Jim Johnstone
D. G. Jones (1929–2016), poet, translator, and educator
El Jones, poet and activist
Julie Joosten
Clifton Joseph
Eve Joseph (born 1953), poet and author

K 

Surjeet Kalsey, poet, dramatist, short-story writer, and translator who writes in both Punjabi and English
Smaro Kamboureli, poet and academic
Donna Kane
Adeena Karasick, poet and academic
Rupi Kaur, poet and illustrator
Lionel Kearns (born 1937), poet and teacher
Diane Keating
Kaie Kellough
M. T. Kelly (born 1946), novelist, poet, and playwright.
Penn Kemp, novelist, playwright, poet and sound poet
Leo Kennedy (1907–2000), modernist poet, published in the 1930s
Robert Kirkland Kernighan (1854–1926), poet, journalist, and farmer
Roy Kiyooka (1926–1994), photographer, poet, and artist
Barbara Klar
Johann Peter Klassen (1868–1947), Russian Mennonite poet and writer who immigrated to Canada in 1923 and wrote primarily in German
Sarah Klassen (born 1932), poet and fiction writer
A. M. Klein (1909–1972), poet, journalist, novelist, and short-story writer
Raymond Knister (1899–1932), novelist, short-story writer, poet, critic, and journalist
Joy Kogawa (born 1935), poet and novelist
Maka Kotto (born 1961), Cameroon-born francophone Canadian, provincial level politician, former Canadian House of Commons member who published a book of poetry in 2002
Shane Koyczan (born 1976), spoken word poet
Robert Kroetsch (born 1927)), novelist, poet, non-fiction writer, and academic
Aaron Kreuter
Janice Kulyk Keefer (born 1952), novelist, poet, and academic

L 

Kama La Mackerel
Sonnet L'Abbé, poet and critic
Pierre Labrie (born 1972), French Canadian poet
Edward A. Lacey
Ben Ladouceur
Chloé LaDuchesse
Dany Laferrière (born 1953), Haitian-born francophone novelist, journalist, and poet who moved to Canada in 1976
Annie Lafleur
Catherine Lalonde (born 1974), French Canadian poet and journalist
Archibald Lampman (1861–1899)
Tim Lander (born 1938)
Patrick Lane (1939–2019)
M. Travis Lane (born 1934), American-born Canadian poet who moved to Canada in 1960
Rina Lasnier (1915–1997), French Canadian poet and playwright
Evelyn Lau (born 1971), poet and novelist
Edythe Morahan de Lauzon
Irving Layton (1912–2006)
Georgette LeBlanc
Gérald Leblanc (1947–2005), French Canadian poet, playwright, novelist, essayist, and writer
Félix Leclerc (1914–1988), songwriter, musician, poet, novelist, actor, radio announcer, radio scriptwriter, and writer
Dennis Lee (born 1939), poet, writer and children's fiction author
John B. Lee (born 1951), author, poet, and academic
Lily Alice Lefevre (1854–1938)
Sylvia Legris (born 1960)
John Lent (1948–2006), poet and novelist
Douglas LePan (1914–1998), diplomat, poet, novelist, and academic
Alex Leslie
Lilian Leveridge (1879–1953), poet, short story writer, and non-fiction writer
Katherine Leyton
Tess Liem
Tim Lilburn (born 1950), poet and essayist
Charles Lillard (born 1944–1997), poet and historian
Dorothy Livesay (1909–1996)
Billie Livingston (born 1965), novelist and poet
Douglas Lochhead (1922–2011), poet, librarian, and academic
Jennifer LoveGrove
Pat Lowther (1935–1975)
Laura Lush
Richard Lush (born 1934)
Michael Lynch

M 

Rozena Maart (born 1962), poet, short-story writer, novelist, playwright, academic, and psychotherapist; South African living in Canada
Annick MacAskill
Kathy Mac
Karen Mac Cormack (born 1956), experimental poet born in Zambia, who holds dual British/Canadian citizenship, she has moved from Toronto to Buffalo, New York, with her husband, poet Steve McCaffery
Elizabeth Roberts MacDonald (1864–1922), poet, children's literature, short story writer and essayist
Hugh MacDonald (born 1945), poet, children's writer and editor
Wilson MacDonald (1880–1967)
Gwendolyn MacEwen (1941–1987), novelist and poet
Walter Scott MacFarlane (1896–1979), poet and soldier
Tom MacInnes (1867–1951), poet and writer
Andrea MacPherson, poet and novelist
Jay Macpherson (born 13 June 1931), poet and academic (a woman)*
Keith Maillard (born 28 February 1942), author and poet
Charles Mair (1838/1840–1927), poet and political activist
Robert Majzels (born 1950), novelist, poet, playwright, and translator
Alice Major, contemporary poet
Kim Maltman (born 1951), poet and physicist (a man)
Donato Mancini
Eli Mandel (1922–1992), poet, essayist, and academic
Ahdri Zhina Mandiela (born 1953), Jamaican-born dub poet, theatre producer, and artistic director; Jamaican native living in Canada
David Manicom (born 1960), diplomat, poet, and novelist
Lee Maracle (born 1950), Native American poet and author
Blaine Marchand
Nicole Markotic, poet and novelist
Daphne Marlatt, née Buckle (born 1942)
Tom Marshall (1938–1993), Canadian poet and novelist
Émile Martel
Garth Martens
Camille Martin (born 1956), poet and collage artist
Sid Marty (born 1944), poet, author, and musician
Robin Mathews (born 1931), poet and professor, known for his political activism in support of Canadian independence from U.S. domination
Seymour Mayne (born 1944), poet and literary translator
Micheline Maylor (born 1970), poet and academic
Chandra Mayor (born 1973), poet and novelist
Robert McBride (1811/1812–1895), Irish-born Canadian poet
Steven McCabe, contemporary artist and poet
Steve McCaffery (born 1947), poet and academic born in England and moved to Toronto in 1968; husband of poet Karen MacCormack
Julia McCarthy
Susan McCaslin (born 1947), poet and academic
Alma Frances McCollum (1879–1906), poet and composer
Kathleen McCracken
John McCrae (1872–1918), poet, physician, author, artist, and soldier during World War I, and a surgeon during the battle of Ypres; best known for writing the famous war memorial poem In Flanders Fields.
Roy McDonald (born 1937–ca. 2018), poet and busker (street performer)
David McFadden (born 11 October 1940), poet, fiction writer, and travel writer
Wendy McGrath, poet and novelist
David McGimpsey, poet, humorist, and academic
Nadine McInnis (born 1956), poet, short-story writer and essayist
James McIntyre (1828–1906), called The Cheese Poet
Don McKay (born 1942) poet editor and educator
Barry McKinnon (born 1944)
Brendan McLeod (born 1979), poet novelist, member of The Fugitives.
Emily Julian McManus (1865-1918), poet, author, and educator
Susan McMaster (born 1950), poet literary editor and spoken word performer
Eugene McNamara (1930–2016), poet, author and teacher   
Steve McOrmond (born 1957), poet and academic
Mary Melfi (born 1951), Italian-born poet novelist, and playwright who immigrated to Canada as a young child
Joshua Mensch
Iman Mersal (born 1966), Egyptian-born Egyptian/Canadian poet and professor of Arabic literature 
Bruce Meyer (born 1957), poet and academic
Shayne Michael
Anne Michaels (born 1958) poet and novelist
Pauline Michel novelist, poet, playwright, songwriter and screenwriter
Marianne Micros
Roy Miki (born 1942), poet and academic
Phebe Florence Miller (1889-1979), poet and diarist
Kenneth G. Mills (1923–2004)
Roswell George Mills
Gaston Miron (1928–1996), French Canadian poet writer and editor
Lucy Maud Montgomery (1874–1942), primarily an author, but also a poet from Prince Edward Island
Marion E. Moodie (1867–1958), nurse, botanist, and poet
Susanna Moodie (1803–1885), British-born Canadian author and poet
Jacob McArthur Mooney (born 1983)
Pamela Mordecai (born 1942), Jamaican writer, teacher, scholar, and poet living in Canada since 1994
Pierre Morency (born 1942), French Canadian writer, poet, and playwright
Dwayne Morgan spoken word artist, motivational speaker, event organizer, and poet
Jeffrey Morgan, primarily a writer, but with poetry published in Rolling Stone and Bakka Magazine
Kim Morrissey (born 1955), poet and playwright
Colin Morton (born 1948)
A. F. Moritz (born 1947), poet and academic
Garry Thomas Morse
Daniel David Moses (born 1952), Native American Canadian poet and playwright
Erín Moure (born 1955)
Jane Munro (born 1943)
Sachiko Murakami
William Murdoch (1823–1887), Scottish-Canadian poet, writer and gasworks manager who immigrated to Canada in 1854
George Murray, poet and associate editor at Maisonneuve Magazine, contributing editor at several literary magazines
Susan Musgrave (born 1951), poet and children's writer

N 

Akhtar Naraghi
André Narbonne
Roger Nash (born 1942), English-born philosopher, poet, and academic
Lyle Neff (born 1969), poet, journalist, essayist, and literary critic
Lorri Neilsen Glenn, poet, ethnographer, essayist, and academic
Émile Nelligan (1879–1941), francophone poet from Quebec
Holly Nelson (2005–2006), writer, poet, activist, journalist, leader of the Green Party of Manitoba
Pierre Nepveu (born 1946), French Canadian poet, novelist, and essayist
W. H. New (born 1938), poet, editor, and literary critic
bpNichol (1944–1988), born Barrie Phillip Nichol, who often went by his lower-case initials and last name, with no spaces, poet and writer
Cecily Nicholson
Emilia Nielsen
John Newlove (1938–2003)
Alden Nowlan (1933–1983), poet, novelist, playwright, and journalist

O 

Patrick O'Connell (1944–2005)
Alexandra Oliver
Tolu Oloruntoba
Sheree-Lee Olson, novelist, poet, and journalist
Michael Ondaatje (born 1943), Sri Lankan novelist and poet with Canadian citizenship
Heather O'Neill, novelist, poet, short-story writer, screenwriter, and journalist
Gabriel Osson
Fernand Ouellette (born 1930)
Madeleine Ouellette-Michalska (born 1930), French-Canadian writer, novelist, essayist, and poet
Richard Outram (1930–2005), poet and writer; co-founder with his wife, Barbara Howard, of The Gauntlet Press
Catherine Owen, poet and musician

P 

Susan Paddon
P. K. Page (1916–2010)
Corrado Paina (born 1954), Italian poet living in Canada since 1987, editorial director of the quarterly magazine ItalyCanada Trade
Arleen Paré
Fawn Parker
Lisa Pasold
John Pass (born 1947), English-born Canadian poet and academic who has lived in Canada since 1953; married to poet and novelist Theresa Kishkan
Philip Kevin Paul
Amy Parkinson (1855–1938), English-born Canadian poet
Neil Peart (1952–2020), musician, songwriter, producer, author, and drummer of the Canadian Rock band Rush
Soraya Peerbaye
W. T. Pfefferle, poet, writer, and academic
Anthony Phelps
M. NourbeSe Philip (born 1947), poet, novelist, playwright, essayist, and short-story writer
Ben Phillips (born 1947), poet, teacher, and publisher
Alison Pick, poet and novelist
Leah Lakshmi Piepzna-Samarasinha (born 1975), American-born poet, spoken-word poet, writer, educator, and social activist living in Canada
Jean-Guy Pilon (1930–2021), French Canadian poet
Sarah Pinder
George Pirie (1799–1870), newspaper publisher and poet
Al Pittman (1940–2001), poet and playwright
Michel Pleau
Emily Pohl-Weary, novelist, poet, and magazine editor
Craig Poile
Laurent Poliquin (born 1975), French Canadian poet and academic
Sandy Pool
Joël Pourbaix
B. W. Powe (born 1955), author, poet, and academic
Claire Pratt (1921–1995), artist, poet, and editor; daughter of writer and editor Viola Whitney and E. J. Pratt, a poet and academic
E. J. Pratt (1882–1964), poet and academic
Frank Prewett (1893–1962), poet and broadcaster, who spent most of his life in the United Kingdom; a war poet of World War I
Robert Priest (born 1951), poet and children's author
Stefan Psenak (born 1969), French Canadian poet, playwright, and novelist
Al Purdy (1918–2000), writer, editor, and poet

Q 

 Andy Quan (born 1969), author who moved to Australia
 Marion Quednau
 Joseph Quesnel (1746–1809), French Canadian composer, poet, and playwright
 Sina Queyras, poet and academic

R 

Kenneth Radu
Gurcharan Rampuri poet of Punjabi descent who writes in the Punjabi language
Theodore Harding Rand (1835–1900), educator and poet
Ian Iqbal Rashid (born 1971), Canadian/British Muslim poet, screenwriter, and filmmaker of Indian descent; has lived primarily in London
Angela Rawlings (a.k.a. a.rawlings)
James Reaney (1926–2008), poet, playwright, and literary critic
Michael Redhill (born 1966), American-born Canadian poet, playwright, and novelist
Beatrice Redpath (1886–1937), poet and short story writer
D. C. Reid (born 1952), poet, novelist, and short-story writer
Jamie Reid (1941–2015)
Shane Rhodes
Robin Richardson
Lisa Richter (born ), poet, winner of the 2020 (U.S.) National Jewish Book Award for poetry
Charles G.D. Roberts (1860–1943), poet and prose writer; called the "Father of Canadian Poetry" for his influence on other poets
Lisa Robertson (born 1961), poet, essayist, and writer
Matt Robinson (born 1974)
Ajmer Rode, poet, playwright, and writer in Punjabi and English
Gordon Rodgers (born 1952), poet, novelist, and clinical psychologist
Carmen Rodríguez (born 1948), Chilean-Canadian author, poet, educator, political social activist, co-founder of Aquelarre Magazine; exiled from Chile after the 1973 coup; writes in both Spanish and English and translates her own work
 Janet Rogers First Nations poet
 Linda Rogers (born 1944), poet and children's writer
 Joe Rosenblatt (1933–2019), Governor General's Award-winning experimentalist
 Laisha Rosnau (born 1972), novelist and poet
 Bruce Ross, poet, author, academic, and past president of the Haiku Society of America
 Stuart Ross (born 1959), writer, poet, editor, and creative-writing instructor
 W.W.E. Ross (born 1894), imagist poet of the 1920s and 1930s, has been called "Canada's first modern poet"
 Annie Rothwell (1837–1927), writer of paeans to colonial forces during the North-West Rebellion and other imperial wars, she was known among contemporary critics mainly as a war poet.
 Nancy-Gay Rotstein
 Stephen Rowe (born 1980)
 André Roy

S 

Lake Sagaris (born 1956), journalist, poet, and translator living in Chile
Rodney Saint-Éloi
Trish Salah, academic, writer, and poet whose first volume of poetry appeared in 2002
Rebecca Salazar
Peter Sanger (born 1943), poet and prose writer, critic, editor, and academic born in England, immigrated to Canada in 1953
Charles Sangster (1822–1893)
Robyn Sarah (born 1949)
Félix-Antoine Savard (1896–1982), priest, academic, poet, novelist, and folklorist
Jacob Scheier, poet whose first collection of verses won the 2008 Governor General's Award for English poetry, editor, son of Libby Scheier, lives in New York City
Libby Scheier (1946–2000), United States-born poet and short-story writer who moved to Canada in 1975, mother of Jacob Scheier
Andreas Schroeder (born 1946), German-born poet, novelist, and nonfiction writer
Stephen Scobie (born 1943), poet, critic, and academic
Gregory Scofield (born 1966)
Duncan Campbell Scott (1862–1947), poet and writer
F. R. Scott, also known as Frank Scott (1899–1985), poet, intellectual and constitutional expert
Jordan Scott
Peter Dale Scott (born 1929), poet and academic
Olive Senior (born 1941), Jamaican poet and short-story writer living in Canada
Robert W. Service (1874–1958), poet and writer
Kathy Shaidle (born 1964), author, columnist, and poet
Francis Sherman (1871–1926)
Joseph Sherman (1945–2006), poet and visual arts editor
Carol Shields (1935–2003), American-born Canadian novelist, short-story writer, poet, playwright, and writer
Trish Shields, poet and novelist
Ann Shin
Sandy Shreve, poet, newspaper reporter, and office worker
Goran Simic (born 1952), Bosnian-born poet, playwright, and short-story writer living in Canada since 1995
Melanie Siebert
Bren Simmers
Anne Simpson (born 1956), poet and novelist
jaye simpson
Bardia Sinaee
Sue Sinclair
George Sipos
Sonja Skarstedt (born 1960), poet, short-story writer, playwright, painter, and illustrator who founded and edited the now-defunct literary magazine Zymergy (1987–1991), and founded Empyreal Press in 1990
Robin Skelton, sometimes wrote under the pseudonym "Georges Zuk", a purported French surrealist (born 1925–1997), British-born Canadian academic, writer, poet, translator, and anthologist who immigrated to Canada in 1963; a founder and editor of The Mahalat Review
Daniel Sloate (1931–2009), translator, poet, playwright, and academic
Carolyn Smart (born 1952), English-born poet, author and academic
Elizabeth Smart (1913–1986), poet and novelist whose book, By Grand Central Station I Sat Down and Wept, detailed her romance with English poet George Barker
A. J. M. Smith (1902–1980), poet and academic
Clara Kathleen Smith (1911–2004), poet and educator
Douglas Burnet Smith (born 1949)
John Smith (born 1927), poet and academic
Michael V. Smith novelist, poet and filmmaker
Ron Smith (born 1943), poet, author, editor, playwright, and former academic; founder and co-publisher of Oolichan Books in 1984; influential in the founding of Theytus Books in 1971
Steven Ross Smith (born 1945), poet, arts journalist, Poet Laureate of Banff, previous Director Literary Arts, Banff Centre
Karen Solie (born 1966)
David Solway (born 1941), poet, educational theorist, travel writer, and literary critic
Madeline Sonik (born 1960), novelist, short-story writer, children's-book author, editor, and poet
Carolyn Marie Souaid (born 1959), poet and editor, living in Montreal, co-founder of Poetry Quebec magazine
Raymond Souster (1921–2012), Toronto poet
Esta Spalding (born 1966), American-born Canadian author, screenwriter, and poet
Heather Spears (1934–2021), poet, novelist, and artist living in Denmark since 1962
Birk Sproxton (1943–2007), poet and novelist
Harold Standish (1919–1972), poet and novelist
George Stanley, American-born poet and academic associated with the San Francisco Renaissance in his early years, moved to Canada in the 1970s; associated with New Star Books and the Capilano Review
Carmine Starnino, essayist, educator, and editor
Jason Stefanik
John Steffler (born 1947), poet and novelist
Ian Stephens (died 1996), journalist, musician, and poet associated with the spoken word movement
Ricardo Sternberg (born 1948), poet born in Brazil, educated in the United States
Richard Stevenson
Shannon Stewart
W. Gregory Stewart (born 1950), poet, science fiction author, short-story writer who works at a public utility and lives in Los Angeles, California
John Stiles, poet living in London, United Kingdom
Anne Stone, poet, writer, and performance artist
Betsy Struthers (born 1951), poet and novelist
Andrew Suknaski (1942–2012), Saskatchewan poet  
Alan Sullivan (1868–1947), poet, short-story writer, railroad surveyor, and mining engineer
Rosemary Sullivan (born 1947), poet, biographer, academic, and anthologist
Moez Surani (born 1979), poet
John Sutherland (1919–1956), poet, literary critic, and magazine editor who founded and edited First Statement in 1942 and its successor publication, Northern Review in 1945
Robert Swanson 1905–1994)
Robert Sward (born 1933), American and Canadian poet and novelist
George Swede (born 1940), Latvian-born Canadian children's writer and poet who writes Haiku in English
Todd Swift (born 1966), poet, editor, and academic living in the United Kingdom
Anne Szumigalski (1922–1999)

T 

Proma Tagore
Bruce Taylor (born 1960)
Heather Taylor (born 1977), poet, playwright, and teacher living in England since 2002
Ruth Taylor (1961–2006), poet, editor, and academic
John Terpstra, poet and carpenter
Souvankham Thammavongsa,  poet and short story writer
Sharon Thesen (born 1946), poet and academic
Serge Patrice Thibodeau (born 1959)
Kai Cheng Thom
Edward William Thomson (1849–1924), journalist, writer, and poet
John Thompson (1938–1976)
Russell Thornton, poet
Matthew Tierney (born 1970)
Jose Tlatelpas (born 1953), Mexican native and Canadian resident; Native cultures poet, publisher, and political activist
Mohamud Siad Togane (born 1943), Somali native and Canadian resident; poet, academic, and political activist
Lola Lemire Tostevin (born 1937), poet, novelist, and writer
Michaël Trahan (born 1984), poet
Kim Trainor, Vancouver poet
Rhea Tregebov (born 1953), poet and children's writer
Raymond D. Tremblay, poet, writer, social services agency official
Roland Michel Tremblay (born 1972), French-Canadian author, poet, scriptwriter, development producer, and science-fiction consultant who moved to London, England in 1995
Tony Tremblay (born 1968), French-Canadian poet, writer, spoken word artist, journalist, and radio personality
Peter Trower (1930–2017), poet and novelist
Mark Truscott (born 1970), born in the United States
Élise Turcotte (born 26 June 1957), French-Canadian writer and poet
Arielle Twist
John Tyndall
Daniel Scott Tysdal (born 1978)

U 

 Marie Uguay (1955–1981), French-Canadian poet
 Priscila Uppal (born 1974), poet and novelist
 David UU (David W. Harris) (1948–1994), visual poet

V 

 Léonise Valois (1868–1936), first French Canadian woman to publish a collection of poetry
 Peter van Toorn (born 1944)
 R. M. Vaughan (1965–2020), poet, novelist, and playwright
 Paul Vermeersch (born 1973)
 Katherena Vermette
 Gilles Vigneault (born 1928), Quebec poet, publisher, and singer-songwriter; Quebec nationalist and sovereigntist
 Pamelia Sarah Vining (1826–1897)
 Garth Von Buchholz (also G.A. Buchholz), British Columbia poet, dark fiction author, playwright, journalist, and arts critic
 Prvoslav Vujčić (born 1960)

W 

Miriam Waddington (née Dworkin 1917–2004), poet, short-story writer, and translator
 Michael Wade (1944–2004)
 Fred Wah (born 1939), poet, novelist, and scholar
 Bronwen Wallace (1945–1989), poet and short-story writer
 Tom Walmsley (born 1948), playwright, novelist, poet, and screenwriter
 Agnes Walsh (born 1950), actor, poet, playwright, and storyteller
 David Waltner-Toews (born 1948), epidemiologist, essayist, poet, fiction writer, veterinarian, and a specialist in the epidemiology of food and waterborne diseases, zoonoses, and ecosystem health
 Terry Watada author, writer, and poet
 Alison Watt (born 1957), writer, poet, and painter
 Tom Wayman (born 1945), poet and academic
 Phyllis Webb (1927–2021), poet and radio broadcaster
 John Weier (born 1949)
 Matthew James Weigel
 Robert Stanley Weir (1856–1926), judge and poet most famous for writing the English lyrics to O Canada, the national anthem of Canada
 Zachariah Wells (born 1976), poet, critic, essayist, and editor
 Darren Wershler-Henry (born 1966), experimental poet, non-fiction writer, and cultural critic
 David Wevill (born 1935)
 Dawud Wharnsby (born 1972), singer-songwriter, poet, performer, educator, and television personality
 Michael Whelan (born 1858–1937) teacher, bookkeeper, and poet
 Joshua Whitehead
 Bruce Whiteman (born 1952), poet, writer, scholar, and essayist
 Isabella Whiteford (1835–1905), poet who also write under the name Caed Mille Failtha
 Zoe Whittall (born 1976), poet and novelist
 Anne Wilkinson (1910–1961), poet, writer, and essayist
 Alan R. Wilson
 Anne Elizabeth Wilson (1901–1946) poet, writer, editor
 Sheri-D Wilson, poet and playwright
 Rob Winger, poet and academic
 Theresa Wolfwood, political activist and poet
 George Woodcock (1912–1995), poet, essayist, critic, biographer, and historian; the founder (in 1959) of the journal Canadian Literature
 Lance Woolaver (born 1948), author, poet, playwright, and director

Y 

 Isa Hasan al-Yasiri (1942), Iraqi-Canadian poet
 J. Michael Yates (1938–2019), poet and dramatist
 Leo Yerxa
 Jean Yoon (born 1962), actor, poet, and playwright
 D'bi Young, born in Jamaica, moved to Canada in 1993; dub poet, actor, and playwright
 Ian Young
 Josée Yvon

Z 

Robert Zend (1929–1985), Hungarian-Canadian poet, fiction writer, and multi-media artist
David Zieroth
Rachel Zolf, poet and editor
Daniel Zomparelli
Carolyn Zonailo (born 1947), poet and publisher
Jan Zwicky (born 1955), philosopher, poet, essayist, and violinist

See also 

List of Canadian writers
List of poets
List of poetry awards
List of years in poetry
List of years in literature

References 

Canada
 
Poets